Claire Nouvian (born 19 March 1974) is a French environmental activist, journalist, television producer, film director and organizational leader.

Claire Nouvian was born in Bordeaux. After a career in journalism, she engaged in advocacy for protection of the ocean and marine life. She received the Goldman Environment Prize in 2018, the second French person to receive this prize (after biologist Christine Jean in 1992).

References

1974 births
Living people
Mass media people from Bordeaux
French journalists
French film directors
French environmentalists
Women environmentalists
Place Publique politicians
Goldman Environmental Prize awardees